Anabelle Prawerman (born 13 January 1963) is a former female beach volleyball player from France, who twice represented France at the Summer Olympics: 1996 and 2000. Partnering Cécile Rigaux she won the silver medal at the 1999 European Championships.

Playing partners
 Brigitte Lesage
 Cécile Rigaux

References

External links
 
 
 

1963 births
Living people
French beach volleyball players
Beach volleyball players at the 1996 Summer Olympics
Beach volleyball players at the 2000 Summer Olympics
Olympic beach volleyball players of France
Volleyball players from Paris
Women's beach volleyball players